Stationary steam engines are fixed steam engines used for pumping or driving mills and factories, and for power generation. They are distinct from locomotive engines used on railways, traction engines for heavy steam haulage on roads, steam cars (and other motor vehicles), agricultural engines used for ploughing or threshing, marine engines, and the steam turbines used as the mechanism of power generation for most nuclear power plants.

They were introduced during the 18th century and widely made for the whole of the 19th century and most of the first half of the 20th century, only declining as electricity supply and the internal combustion engine became more widespread.

Types of stationary steam engine

There are different patterns of stationary steam engines, distinguished by
the layout of the cylinders and crankshaft:
Beam engines have a rocking beam providing the connection between the vertical cylinder and crankshaft.
Table engines have the crosshead above the vertical cylinder and the crankshaft below.
Horizontal engines have a horizontal cylinder.
Vertical engines have a vertical cylinder.
Inclined engines have an inclined cylinder.
Undertype engines are distinguished by having a locomotive-style boiler over top of a horizontal engine. 

Stationary engines may be classified by secondary characteristics as well:
High-speed engines are distinguished by fast-acting valves.
Corliss engines are distinguished by special rotary valve gear.
Uniflow engines have admission valves at the cylinder heads and exhaust ports at the midpoint.

When stationary engines had multiple cylinders, they could be classified as:
Simple engines, with multiple identical cylinders operating on a common crankshaft.
Compound engines which use the exhaust from high-pressure cylinders to power low-pressure cylinders.

An engine could be run in simple or condensing mode:
 Simple mode meant the exhaust gas left the cylinder and passed straight into the atmosphere
 In condensing mode, the steam was cooled in a separate cylinder, and changed from vapour to liquid water, creating a vacuum that assisted with the motion. This could be done with a water-cooled plate that acted as a heat sink, or pumping-in a spray of water.

Stationary engines may also be classified by their application:
Pumping engines are found in pumping stations.
Mill engines to power textile mills
Winding engines power various types of hoists.
Refrigeration engines are typically coupled to ammonia compressors.

Stationary engines could be classified by the manufacturer
Boulton & Watt
George Saxon & Co

History
In order of evolution:

 Savery atmospheric engine (1700)
 Newcomen engine (1712)
 Watt engine (1775)
 Hornblower (1781)
 Trevithick (1799) 
 Woolf (1804)
 Cornish engine (1812)
 McNaught'ed compound beam engines (1845)
 Corliss engine(1859)
 Porter-Allen engine (1862)
 Uniflow engine Todd's (1885)
 Steam turbine (1889)

See also

Boilers
Centrifugal governor
Lineshaft
Belt
List of steam energy topics
Live steam
Steam fair
Stationary engine
Steam donkey
Preserved stationary steam engines

References

Bibliography
Buchanan, R. A., and Watkins, George, The Industrial Archaeology of the Stationary Steam Engine, London, 1976, 

Watkins, George, Stationary Steam Engines of Great Britain, Landmark Publishing, various ISBNs
Vol 1, Yorkshire (2000)
Vol 2, Scotland and Northern England (2000)
Vols 3:1, 3:2, Lancashire (2001)
Vol 4, Wales, Cheshire,& Shropshire (2002)
Vol 5, The North Midlands (2002)
Vol 6, The South Midlands (2003)
Vol 7, The South and South West (2003)
Vol 8, Greater London and the South East (2003)
Vol 9, East Anglia & adjacent counties (2004)
Vol 10, Marine Engines (and readers' notes, indexes to the series etc) (2005)

This series reproduces some 1,500 images from the Steam Engine Record made by George Watkins between 1930 and 1980, which is now in the Watkins Collection at English Heritage's National Monuments Record at Swindon, Wilts.

External links
 
 
Old Engine House, List of Museums – examples of stationary steam engines preserved in the UK (with pictures and links)
International Steam.co.uk – comprehensive coverage of stationary steam engines in their original locations, working and non-working, in many countries
preserved stationary steam engines – includes lesser-known museums containing such engines (UK)
Steamers steam engine forum – Questions and answers about old steam engines, traction engines

Stationary steam engines
Steam engines
Stationary engines